Seán Kelly (born 26 April 1952) is an Irish politician who has been a Member of the European Parliament (MEP) from Ireland for the South constituency since July 2009. He is a member of Fine Gael, part of the European People's Party.

He served as the 34th President of the Gaelic Athletic Association from 2003 to 2006. He was the first person from County Kerry to hold the office, being elected at his first attempt by a record margin at the GAA Congress in 2002. In July 2006, he took up the position of Executive Chairman of the Irish Institute of Sport, a body that was set up in Ireland to support elite athletes and players, and served as Executive President until he announced his resignation in July 2008.

Early and personal life
Kelly was born in Knockataggle, Kilcummin, Killarney, County Kerry in 1952. He was born into a family that was deeply involved in the Gaelic Athletic Association. His grandfather had been chairman of the local club and his four uncles had distinguished playing careers, with his uncle, also Seán Kelly, starring at full-forward for Kerry in their All-Ireland Championship success over Armagh in 1953. He is a first cousin to Fionnuala O'Kelly, wife of former Taoiseach Enda Kenny.

Kelly was educated at Kilcummin National School, Tralee CBS and St Brendan's College, Killarney. He qualified as a primary school teacher in St Patrick's College of Education, Drumcondra and then attended University College Dublin where he received a BA in 1974 and Higher Diploma in Education (HDip) in 1975. He worked as a teacher in Dublin (Cromcastle Green, Kilmore West) and in St. Brendan's, Killarney.

GAA career
Before being elected president of the GAA he served as chairman of the East Kerry from 1975 to 1987 and County Kerry Boards from 1987 to 1997 and Munster Council from 1997 to 2000. He also was one of the founding members of the St Patrick's (East Kerry) hurling team in 1984. As county chairman, he founded the Kerry GAA Supporters' Club in 1987.

As the first person from County Kerry to hold the office of President of the Gaelic Athletic Association, his presidency is seen as a landmark one in moving forward the Association on so many fronts with the introduction of Christy Ring Cup and Nicky Rackard Cup, Tommy Murphy Cup, All-Ireland Junior and Intermediate Championships, he also oversaw the completion of the Croke Park re-development through the completion of Hill 16/Northern end and the building of the Croke Park Jury's Hotel. He introduced the President's Awards and developed a great working relationship with the GPA and initiated major improvements in player welfare matters.

He is also credited with the successful conclusion of arrangements for the use of Croke Park, the GAA's 82,500 capacity national stadium, by the Irish Rugby Football Union and the Football Association of Ireland while Lansdowne Road was being re-developed.

He has received a string of awards including Person of the Year 2005, Community Entrepreneur of the Year 2006, Business Person of the month (April 2005) and was awarded an honorary doctorate by Dublin Institute of Technology in February 2007.

Political career

Seán Kelly was elected as a Fine Gael candidate at the 2009 European Parliament election for the South constituency, at the expense of sitting MEP and party colleague Colm Burke. Kelly is a member of the European Parliament's Committee on Industry, Research and Energy, the Committee on International Trade and the Committee on Constitutional Affairs. He is a member of the delegation for relations with South Africa and he serves as a member of the Delegation for relations with the Countries of South East Asia and ASEAN.

He later represented the European Parliament at the 2015 United Nations Climate Change Conference in Paris and at the 2016 United Nations Climate Change Conference in Marrakesh

Kelly has been highly active since entering the Parliament, having spoken in the plenary session 529 times and tabled over 340 parliamentary questions as of February 2013.

Kelly was elected MEP of the Year for Research and Innovation by fellow MEPs for his work on the European Parliament's ITRE Committee in 2012.

Kelly is a recipient of IAB Europe's Award for Leadership and Excellence in Public Policy for his work on data protection.

He had been mentioned as a possible Fine Gael candidate for the 2011 presidential election. He was re-elected as an MEP for the South constituency at the 2014 European Parliament election.

In December 2020, Kelly received the Industry, Research & Innovation award at The Parliament Magazine's annual MEP Awards.

Kelly is known for his frequent use of the Irish Language in the European Parliament. In January 2022, he submitted the first amendment to EU legislation that was written in the Irish Language.

References

External links
Seán Kelly's page on the Fine Gael website
Seán Kelly's page on the VoteWatch website

 

1952 births
Living people
Alumni of University College Dublin
Alumni of St Patrick's College, Dublin
Chairmen of Gaelic games governing bodies 
Fine Gael MEPs
Founders of Gaelic games institutions
Irish schoolteachers
Irish sportsperson-politicians
Kerry County Board administrators
Kilcummin Gaelic footballers
MEPs for the Republic of Ireland 2009–2014
MEPs for the Republic of Ireland 2014–2019
MEPs for the Republic of Ireland 2019–2024
Munster Provincial Council administrators
People educated at St Brendan's College, Killarney
Politicians from County Kerry
Presidents of the Gaelic Athletic Association
St Patrick's (Kerry) hurlers